Cheraw (YTB-802) was a United States Navy  named for Cheraw, South Carolina.

Construction

The contract for Cheraw was awarded 2 May 1968. She was laid down on 12 March 1969 at Slidell, Louisiana, by Southern Shipbuilding Corp and launched 20 September 1969.

Operational history

Cheraw was delivered to the Navy on 29 January 1970.

Stricken from the Navy List 29 February 1996, ex-Cheraw (YTB-802) was transferred to the Army Corps of Engineers 29 December 1996 at Buffalo, New York and renamed Cheraw.

References

External links
 

 

Natick-class large harbor tugs
Ships built in Slidell, Louisiana
1969 ships